Rabbi Yaakov Gesundheit (1815-1878) was the chief rabbi of Warsaw from 1870 to about 1874.

He conducted a yeshivah for forty-two years; some of his many pupils becoming well-known rabbis. In 1870 he was chosen rabbi of Warsaw and held the office for about four years, when he was compelled to relinquish it on account of not being acceptable to the chasidim.

He finished Sifte Kohen at the age of eighteen. At twenty-three he wrote Tiferet Yaakov, on Shulchan Aruch Choshen Mishpat (Warsaw, 1842), but the larger part of the edition was destroyed by order of the censor (see Fürst, Bibliotheca Judaica v. 3). 

His other published works also bear the same name, Tiferet Yaakov, and comprise commentary and novellae on the Talmudic tractates Gittin (ib. 1858) and Chullin (ib. 1867). These works remain popular today. He also left several works in manuscript.

A grandnephew was financial analyst Benjamin Graham.

References

Notes

1815 births
1878 deaths
Rabbis from Warsaw